Catholic Societies may refer to:

 Catholic societies of the Church of England, societies promoting Anglo-Catholicism within the Church of England and the Anglican Communion.
 American Federation of Catholic Societies, a Roman Catholic association in the United States of America, active from 1901 to 1917.